Yuriy Ivanovich Semenov (born September 5, 1929) is a Soviet and Russian historian, philosopher, ethnologist, anthropologist, expert on the history of philosophy, history of primitive society, and the theory of knowledge. He is also the original creator of the globally-formation (relay-stadial) concept of world history and is a Doctor of Philosophy, Doctor of Historical Sciences (1963), and Professor.

He graduated from the history department of the Krasnoyarsk State Pedagogical Institute (1951). For a while he taught history in the provincial universities. After his work in the field of anthroposotsiogenesis attracted the attention of prominent scientists of Moscow, he defended his doctoral thesis at the Institute of Ethnography (1963). In 1967, Semenov became a professor of the Department of Philosophy of the Moscow Physical-Technical Institute (Dolgoprudny), where he has worked for half a century and continued to the present (fall 2015). Semenov has also worked at the Institute of World History, USSR Academy of Sciences and the Institute of Ethnology and Anthropology.

Having begun a scientific career by studying the primitive society, Semenov simultaneously developed the problem of political society - first class societies that preceded feudalism. Research in this area led him to create the original globally stadial concept of world history. Throughout his academic career sharing the basic principles of Marxism, Semenov developed these ideas according to the new factual material, thus becoming one of the prominent members of the Soviet (and later - Russian) "creative Marxism".

Selected publications
 1 2 3 4 5 Семёнов Ю. И. О моем «пути в первобытность». // Академик Ю. В. Бромлей и отечественная этнология. 1960—1990-е годы. — М.: Наука, 2003. — С. 164–211.
Семёнов Ю. И. Антропосоциогенез // Социальная философия: Учебный словарь. — М.: Академический проект, 2008. — С. 12–17.
Семёнов Ю. И. «Происхождение семьи, частной собственности и государства» Ф. Энгельса и современные данные этнографии. // Вопросы философии. — 1959. — No. 7. — С. 137–147.
Семёнов Ю. И. О теории первобытности и о многом другом. Часть 2. // Личность. Культура. Общество. — Т. VIII. — No. 2. — С. 77–94.
Семёнов Ю. И. По поводу рецензии Бахты // Народы Азии и Африки. — 1971. — No. 3. — С. 245–247.
Семёнов Ю. И. Проблема перехода от материнского рода к отцовскому (Опыт теоретического анализа) // Советская этнография. — 1970. — No. 5. — С. 57–71.
Семёнов Ю. И. Проблема исторического соотношения материнской и отцовской филиации у австралийцев // Советская этнография. — 1971. — No. 6. — С. 101–111.
Семёнов Ю. И. О материнском роде и оседлости в позднем палеолите // Советская этнография. — 1973. — No. 4.
Семёнов Ю. И. О специфике производственных (социально-экономических) отношений первобытного общества // Советская этнография. — 1976. — No. 4. — С. 93–113.
Семёнов Ю. И. Об изначальной форме первобытных социально-экономических отношений // Советская этнография. — 1977. — No. 2. — С. 15–20.
 1 2 Семёнв Ю. И. О различии между доказательствами ad veritatem и ad hominem, о некоторых моментах моей научной биографии и эпизодах из истории советской этнографии и еще раз о книге Н. М. Гиренко «Социология племени» // Этнографическое обозрение. — 1994. — № 6. — С. 3—19.
 1 2 Семёнов Ю. И. По поводу статьи О. Ю. Артёмовой «Отечественная теория „первобытности“ и социальная организация аборигенов Австралии» // Личность. Культура. Общество. — 2005. — Т. VII. — No. 4. — С. 384–389.
Семёнов Ю. И. Разработка проблем истории первобытного общества в Институте этнографии АН СССР в «эпоху» Бромлея (воспоминания и размышления) // Этнографическое обозрение. — 2001. — No. 6. — С. 3—20.
Семёнов Ю. И. О теории первобытности и о многом другом. Ч. 1 // Личность. Культура. Общество. — 2006. — Т. VIII. — No. 1. — С. 80–98.
Семёнов Ю. И. О теории первобытности и о многом другом. Ч. 2 // Личность. Культура. Общество. — 2006. — Т. VIII. — No. 2. — С. 77–94.
Семёнов Ю. И. Переход от первобытного общества к классовому: пути и варианты развития // Этнографическое обозрение. — 1993. — No. 1. — С. 52–70.
Семёнов Ю. И. Переход от первобытного общества к классовому: пути и варианты развития // Этнографическое обозрение. — 1993. — No. 2. — С. 57–74.
Семёнов Ю. И. Дилетантизм против науки (размышления об одной рецензии). «Скепсис». Проверено 29 марта 2012. Архивировано 4 июня 2012 года.
Ю. И. Семёнов, Введение во всемирную историю. Выпуск I. Проблема и понятийный аппарат. Возникновение человеческого общества
Семёнов Ю. И. Теория общественно-экономических формаций и всемирный исторический процесс // Народы Азии и Африки. — 1970. — No. 5. — С. 82–95. То же на англ. языке // Soviet Anthropology and Archaeology. — 1965. — Vol. 4. — No. 2
Семёнов Ю. И. Марксистско-ленинская теория общественно-экономических формаций и исторический процесс // Философские науки. — 1973. — No. 5. — С. 3–13. То же на нем. языке // Sowjetwissenschaft Gesellschaftwissenschaftliche Beitrage. 1974. H.2; То же на испан. языке: Habana, 1987.
Semenov Yu. I. The Theory of Socioeconomic Formations and World History // Soviet and Western Anthropology. — 1980. — P. 29–58.
Semenov Yu. I. Socioeconomic Formations in Historical Process // Philosophy in USSR. Problems of Historical Materialism. — M.: Progress Publishers, 1981. — P. 33–51.
(Семёнов, 2008, с. 300.
 Семёнов Ю. И. Из истории теоретической разработки В. И. Лениным национального вопроса // Народы Азии и Африки. — 1966. — No. 4. — С. 106–129.
Семёнов Ю. И. К определению понятия «нация» // Народы Азии и Африки. — 1967. — No. 4. — С. 86–102.
(Семёнов Ю. И. Нация // Словарь философских терминов. — М.: ИНФРА-М, 2004. — С. 350–352.

References

Гобозов И. Юрию Ивановичу Семёнову 75 лет // Философия и общество. — 2004. — No. 3. — С. 193–202.
Интервью с проф. Ю. И. Семёновым // Личность. Культура. Общество. — Т. VI, No. 4 (24). — С. 322–340.
Klein R. [Review] // American Anthropologist, New Series. — 1969. — Vol. 71. — No. 2. — P. 343–344.
Dobzhansky Th. [Review] // Man, New Series. — 1968. — Vol. 3. — No. 1. — P. 136–138.
Геллнер Э. Марксистская книга Бытия // Этнографическое обозрение. — 1992. — No. 2. — С. 35–51.
Марков Г. Е. [Рецензия: Ю. И. Семёнов. Происхождение брака и семьи]. // Вопросы истории. — 1976. — No. 6. — С. 159–162.
Работы основных оппонентов Семёнова:
Бахта В. М. Папуасы Новой Гвинеи: производство и общество // Проблемы истории докапиталистических обществ : Сб. статей. — М.: Наука, 1968. — С. 266–325.
Бутинов Н. А. Первобытнообщинный строй (основные этапы и локальные варианты) // Проблемы истории докапиталистических обществ : Сб. статей. — М.: Наука, 1968. — С. 89–155.
Кабо В. Р. Первобытная община охотников и собирателей // Проблемы истории докапиталистических обществ : Сб. статей. — М.: Наука, 1968. — С. 233–365.
Рубин В. А. Дневники. Письма / науч. ред. Л. Дымерская-Цигельман; обл. А. Резницкого. - [Израиль], 1989. - Репр. воспр. изд. 1988 г., Кн. 1 / предисл. И. М. Рубиной. - 292 с. : 6 л. ил., 1 л. портр. - (Библиотека Алия; 124).
Кабо В. Р., Семёнов Ю. И. [Рецензия на Н. А. Бутинов. Папуасы Новой Гвинеи (хозяйство, общественный строй)] // Советская этнография. — 1969. — No. 3. — С. 159–170.
Бахта В. М. Рецензия на Н. А. Бутинов «Папуасы Новой Гвинеи» // Народы Азии и Африки. — 1970. — No. 3.
Членов М. А. Можно ли считать «австралийскую контроверзу» разрешенной? (по поводу статьи Ю. И. Семёнова «Проблема перехода от материнского рода к отцовскому. Опыт теоретического анализа») // Советская этнография. — 1971. — No. 4. — С. 68–71.
Хазанов А. М. Природно-хозяйственные различия в каменном веке и проблема первичности материнского рода // Советская этнография. — 1973. — No. 1.
Членов М. А. Ещё раз об «австралийской контроверзе» и методике её рассмотрения // Советская этнография. — 1974. — No. 6. — С. 51–57.
Хазанов А. М. О связи линейности и локальности с образом жизни // Советская этнография. — 1974. — No. 6. — С. 58–61.
Крюков М. В. Даёт ли система брачных классов ключ к разгадке «австралийской контроверзы»? // Советская этнография. — 1974. — No. 3.
Гурьев Д.В. О специфике производственных отношений первобытного общества (в связи с обсуждением концепции Ю. И. Семёнова) // Советская этнография. — 1977. — No. 1. — С. 71–84.
Козодоев И.И. О необходимом и прибавочном продукте в первобытной экономике // Советская этнография. — 1977. — No. 3. — С. 59–63.
О некоторых теоретических проблемах экономики первобытного общества // СЭ. 1978. No. 4. С. 58–75.
Артемова О. Ю. Отечественная теория «первобытности» и социальная организация австралийских аборигенов // Этнографическое обозрение. — 2004. — No. 1. — С. 114–133.
Пучков П. И. [Обзор] // Вопросы истории. — 1995. — No. 10. — С. 169–172.
Статья была опубликована в двух частях:
Коротаев А. В. Некоторые проблемы эволюции архаических (и не только архаических) обществ (Ответ Ю. И. Семёнову). // Восток. — 1995. — No. 5. — С. 211–221.
Вступительная статья в книге Сергеевич В. И. «Древности русского права». В трёх томах. Гос. публ. ист. б-ка России. — М., 2007.
Тарасов А. Н. Опять тупик // Пушкин. — 2009. — No. 4.
Илюшечкин В. П. Теория стадийного развития общества (история и проблемы). — М.: Издательская фирма «Восточная литература» РАН, 1996. — С. 148. — 406 с.
Работы Ю. И. Семёнова на тему глобально-стадиальной концепции мировой истории:
Марксистско-ленинская теория общественно-экономических формаций и всемирная история // Актуальные проблемы марксистско-ленинского учения об общественно-экономических формациях. М., 1975. С. 53–87.
 Джохадзе Д. В. Бесценное приобретение мирового обществоведения // Философия и общество. — 2006. — No. 3. — С. 189–192.
 Муравьёв Ю. Рецензия на книгу: Семенов Ю.И. Философия истории от истоков до наших дней. // Первое сентября. — 2000. — No. 36.
Пименов А. В. Между прошлым и будущим: история и другие гуманитарные науки на физтехе. // Я — физтех (книга очерков). — М.: 1996. — С. 493.

External links
 Семенов Ю. И. - Новости

Prehistorians
Living people
1929 births
Russian anthropologists
Academic staff of the Moscow Institute of Physics and Technology
Soviet professors
Russian professors